Kiowa is a town in Pittsburg County, Oklahoma, United States. The population was 731 at the 2010 census.

History 
At the time of its founding, Kiowa was located in Jacksfork County, Choctaw Nation, in the Indian Territory.  Its location is placed by some maps as in Tobucksy County, which included McAlester; the boundary was very near.  

A post office was established at Kiowa, Indian Territory on May 6, 1881.  It took its name from nearby Kiowa Hill.

Geography
Kiowa is located at  (34.722460, -95.903349).

Demographics

As of the census of 2000, there were 693 people, 293 households, and 200 families residing in the town. There were 335 housing units at an average density of 260.2 per square mile (100.3/km2). The racial makeup of the town was 75.1% White, 14.2% Native American, and 6.8% from two or more races, 0.3% African American. Hispanic or Latino of any race were 3.6% of the population.

There were 293 households, out of which 28.7% had children under the age of 18 living with them, 56.0% were married couples living together, 8.2% had a female householder with no husband present, and 31.4% were non-families. 28.7% of all households were made up of individuals, and 15.4% had someone living alone who was 65 years of age or older. The average household size was 2.37 and the average family size was 2.92.

In the town, the population was spread out, with 25.0% under the age of 18, 6.8% from 18 to 24, 26.6% from 25 to 44, 23.4% from 45 to 64, and 18.3% who were 65 years of age or older. The median age was 38 years. For every 100 females, there were 90.4 males. For every 100 females age 18 and over, there were 93.3 males.

The median income for a household in the town was $22,614, and the median income for a family was $33,125. Males had a median income of $22,188 versus $20,000 for females. The per capita income for the town was $17,948. About 16.6% of families and 20.1% of the population were below the poverty line, including 22.2% of those under age 18 and 20.0% of those age 65 or over.

Notable people
 Reba McEntire, singer/actress
 Clonie Gowen, poker player
 Rip Radcliff, baseball player

References

Towns in Pittsburg County, Oklahoma
Towns in Oklahoma